The women's downhill at the 2011 Asian Winter Games was held on January 31, 2011 at Shymbulak Alpine Sport Resort in Almaty, Kazakhstan.

Schedule
All times are Almaty Time (UTC+06:00)

Results
Legend
DNF — Did not finish
DNS — Did not start

References

Results

External links
 Official website

Women Downhill